Henoch Conombo (born 13 June 1986) is a Burkinabé former professional footballer who played as a striker.

Club career
Born in Ouagadougou, Conombo began his career in the youth of SC Bastia and was promoted to first team in 2004.

In summer 2009 moved to fifth-tier side Chambéry SF, after being released by SC Bastia in the French Ligue 2.

International career
Inside 2004 and 2006 played two games and scored one goal for Burkina Faso.

References

External links
 

1986 births
Living people
Sportspeople from Ouagadougou
Association football forwards
Burkinabé footballers
Burkina Faso international footballers
Ligue 1 players
Ligue 2 players
Championnat National 2 players
Championnat National 3 players
SC Bastia players
Burkinabé expatriate footballers
Expatriate footballers in France
21st-century Burkinabé people
Chambéry SF players